Royal Malaysian Police Cooperative Limited or Koperasi Polis Diraja Malaysia Berhad (KPD), located in Kuala Lumpur, Malaysia, was established on 24 April 1928 to help reduce financial burden in the police department staff by forming a cooperative to provide business borrowing and lending. The conglomerate currently owns assets up to RM 720 million at book value.

Service
KPD provides the following financial services:
 Personal loans
 Unsecured debt
 Mortgages
 Small holdings loans
 Vehicles loans
 Computer loans
 Group insurance

KPD allows its members to withdraw 80% of their savings for special purposes, such as land and house purchases, house renovation, medical expenses and Mecca pilgrimage travel expenses.

Primary, secondary and higher education scholarships are awarded to members' children who demonstrate excellent academic potential. The scholarships may be used locally or abroad. As of June 2010, KPD has around 95,000 members.

Corporate mission
Although The Royal Malaysian Police Co-operative Society Limited (KPD) is chartered as a co-operative society, in essence KPD is a growth oriented asset management company dedicated to servicing the economic interests of its members and the country through obtaining consistently high returns on its investment and businesses. KPD is also committed to high standards of integrity, prudence and business competency.

Commitment to corporate communications 
 Maintain positive communication with all those in contact with the KPD : especially the shareholders, regulators, members of governmental bodies, employees, national and industry leaders, the financial community, and other cooperative.
 Keep the Board of Directors apprised of current topics of interests and maintain an issue-management-ability.
 Communicate KPD's good corporate achievements and future aspirations.
 Be receptive to the needs of shareholders and the country.
 Show and communicate KPD's concern for the consumer.

Subsidiaries
The corps has owned the subsidiaries include:-
 Mantap Corp (KOP Mantap)
 K.L.I Hotel (Kuala Lumpur International Hotel)
 Travel & Tours Corp
 Construction Corps
 Property Maintenance Corps
 Security Agencies Corps
 Transport Corps
 Educator & Consultants Corps
 Aviation Corps

List of chairpeople
 July 2007 to 24 June 2014 - Dato Mohd Amir Bin Sulaiman, Retired Commissioner Of Police
 2006 to 2007         - Tan Sri Mohd Sedek Mohd Ali, Retired Deputy Inspector General of Police
 2004 to 2006         - Dato Maizan Shaari, Retired Deputy Commissioner Of Police

References

External links
 Royal Malaysian Police Cooperative Limited (main site)
 The Royal Malaysian Police Co-operative Society Limited Portal
 Educator & Consultants Corps
 Kuala Lumpur International (KLI) Hotel

Law enforcement in Malaysia
Malaysia
1928 establishments in British Malaya